Paul Smith's College is a private college in Paul Smiths, New York. Paul Smith's College offers associate and bachelor's degrees. Its 14,000-acre campus is one of the largest college campuses in the world. Approximately 1,000 students attend each year.

History
Paul Smith's College was founded through a bequest of Phelps Smith, son of Apollos Smith, whose Paul Smith's Hotel, built in 1859, was the most famous wilderness resort of its era. The first class was matriculated in 1946, and was loosely based on the original hotel's business model. Paul Smith's is located northwest of Saranac Lake, in the hamlet of Paul Smiths in the Town of Brighton.

In 2015 Joan Weill, a former college trustee with a long history of philanthropy benefiting the college, offered a $20 million donation on the condition that the institution change its name to Joan Weill-Paul Smith's College, a change that would have violated Phelps Smith's founding bequest, which required that the school be "forever known" as Paul Smith's College of Arts and Sciences. Justice John T. Ellis of the New York State Supreme Court ruled that the college could not be renamed, and the proposed donation was withdrawn.

Academics 
Classroom space is primarily located at Pickett Hall, Cantwell Hall, and Freer Science Hall. Auxiliary areas include The Joan Weill Adirondack Library, the campus' sawmill, the Saunders Sports Complex, the Joan Weill Student Center and the Paul Smith's College VIC. Two on-campus restaurants, the Ganzi: Palm Training Restaurant and the A.P. Smith's Bakery, are staffed by students and open to the public.

Paul Smith's Fall 2018 acceptance rate was 58%. In the 2019 rankings for the Regional Colleges North category by U.S. News & World Report, the college was ranked #14 overall, #2 in Best Undergraduate Teaching and #2 in Most Innovative Schools.

Campus life 

Most of the college population lives on campus.  Residence halls are divided by class. Freshmen halls include Lydia Martin Smith Hall, Currier Hall, and Lakeside Hall. Incoming transfer students are housed in Franklin Hall. Upperclassmen share Essex, Clinton, Lambert, Blum House, Overlook, Saratoga, Alumni, Upper St. Regis, Lower St. Regis, and Hillside halls. Overlook Hall was opened in 2011 as a LEED-certified "green" dorm for upper-classmen.

Paul Smith's rural location lends itself to many campus-based activities. Student-directed clubs administrated under the Office of Student Activities include fishing and hunting, Adventure Sports Club, Society for Ecological Restoration, Society of American Foresters, the Wildlife Society, Student Government Association, InterVarsity Christian Fellowship, PSC Snowcats, Anime and Gaming club, Fish and Game Club, and Adirondack Mycology club, among others.

The campus is located on Lower St. Regis Lake. Students have a beach, as well as docks and storage for canoes and kayaks.

The Lakeside Dining Hall is operated by Sodexo food service. Both the A.P. Smith's Bakery and The Ganzi: Palm Training Restaurant  in Cantwell Hall opens a few days a week each semester to sell student-produced products.

Athletics 
Paul Smith's athletic teams are the Bobcats (formerly the Falcons). The college is a member of the United States Collegiate Athletic Association (USCAA), primarily competing in the Yankee Small College Conference (YSCC) since the 2010–11 academic year. The Bobcats previously competed in the Sunrise Athletic Conference of the National Association of Intercollegiate Athletics (NAIA) from 2002–03 to 2009–10.

Paul Smith's competes in 11 intercollegiate varsity sports: Men's sports include basketball, cross country, ice hockey, rugby and soccer; while women's sports include basketball, cross country, ice hockey, rugby, soccer and volleyball; and co-ed sports include alpine skiing, bass fishing, bowling, eSsports, golf, marathon canoe, Nordic skiing, snowshoeing, trap shooting and woodsmen.

The newly renovated Saunders Sports Complex houses the Bobcat Fitness Center, a gymnasium, dance studio, and campus pool.  It is home to the school's SCUBA and dive training programs, the kayaking club's whitewater training, and log birling practice, an event in woodsman lumberjack sports competitions.

The facility is open to the general public for a nominal fee. A -tall climbing wall was opened in the adjacent Buxton Annex gymnasium in 2010.

Timbersports take place in both Fall and Spring semesters, with teams practicing every month of the school year.  Events include pole climbing,  log birling, chopping, splitting, sawing, pulp toss, ax-throw, and pack-board relay.

The Paul Smith's woodsmen's team's nine-year winning streak (from 1957–1966) in the sport's biggest event, the Spring Meet, is the longest in the history of intercollegiate lumberjack competition. The school's highly regarded squad travels to meets throughout the Northeast and Ontario, Canada.

Both the men and women's soccer teams at Paul Smith's compete in an annual rivalry game with the teams from SUNY-ESF (State University of New York College of Environmental Science and Forestry), known as the Barkeater Cup. The PSC men's soccer team won the Cup in 2014. Men's and women's team participate in the Yankee Small College Conference regionally, and the USCAA on a national level.

In 2022 the Paul Smith's College Mens Nordic Ski team won the USCSA National Championships located in Lake Placid, NY. The men's  team won three out of the four events.

Presidents 
1st - Earl C. MacArthur - 1942-1945

2nd - Frederick G. Leasure - 1945-1948

3rd - Chester L. Buxton - 1948-1978

4th - Gray Twombly

5th - Thomas Stainback

6th - Harry Miller

7th - H. David Chamberlain

8th - Arthur 'Pete' Linkins

9th - Steven Schneeweiss

10th - Dr. Cathy S. Dove - 2014-2020

11th - Dr. Jon Strauss - 2020-2021

12th - Dr. Scott Dalrymple - 2021-2022

13th - Dr. Nicholas Hunt-Bull - Aug. 2022 – Nov. 2022

14th - Dr. Dan Keating - Nov. 2022 – Present

Notable alumni
John T. Dillon – Chairman and CEO of International Paper from 1996 to 2003.
Jon L. Luther – former CEO of Dunkin' Donuts and former President of Popeyes
Steve Ross – CEO of Kinney National Company, Warner Communications and Time Warner
John Mitzewich – YouTube celebrity chef
Laura James – model, the winner of America's Next Top Model Cycle 19 and the daughter of Dynasty actor John James
Arthur Buezo, Christian Cardiello, James Ford, and Eric Munley – members of The Blind Owl Band

References

External links

 
 Official athletics website

Adirondacks
Private universities and colleges in New York (state)
Educational institutions established in 1946
Forestry education
Education in Franklin County, New York
USCAA member institutions
1946 establishments in New York (state)
Paul Smiths, New York